Yiannakis Matsis (born 24 October 1933) is a Greek Cypriot politician. He was a Member of the European Parliament (MEP) for the European People's Party from 14 June 2004 until June 2009. He did not stand for re-election in the 2009 European elections.

References

1933 births
Living people
People from Nicosia District
Democratic Rally politicians
Cypriot refugees
Leaders of political parties in Cyprus
MEPs for Cyprus 2004–2009
Democratic Rally MEPs